Best of Dogbowl – Volume II is a compilation album by Dogbowl, independently released in 2001 by 62TV Records. Despite the title's suggestion, there was no other greatest hits album released by Dogbowl.

Track listing

Personnel 
Adapted from Best of Dogbowl – Volume II liner notes.

 Dogbowl – vocals, instruments, production, engineering, cover art

Release history

References

External links 
 Best of Dogbowl – Volume II at Discogs (list of releases)

2001 compilation albums
Dogbowl albums